The 1992 Asian Basketball Confederation Championship for Women were held in Seoul, South Korea.

Preliminary round

Final round

3rd place

Final

Final standing

Awards

References
 Results
 archive.fiba.com

1992
1992 in women's basketball
women
International women's basketball competitions hosted by South Korea
B